Marie-Louise Puech-Milhau (1876–1966) was a French pacifist, feminist and journal editor. In 1900, she went to Canada where she became a lecturer at McGill University until 1908 when she returned to France. After the end of the First World War, she became Secretary of the Union pour le Suffrage des Femmes and President of the Union Féminine pour la Société des Nations. She is also remembered for the extensive correspondence she maintained with family members, former students and war veterans.

References

1876 births
1966 deaths
French academics
French editors
French women editors
French feminists
French pacifists
Pacifist feminists
French women writers
Academic staff of McGill University
People from Castres
French expatriates in Canada